Édouard Marie Marc Mény de Marangue (30 November 1882 – 23 January 1960) was a French tennis player who competed in the 1912 Summer Olympics.

In 1912 he won the bronze medal with his partner Albert Canet in the outdoor doubles event. He also competed in the outdoor singles competition but was eliminated in the first round.

References

1882 births
1960 deaths
French male tennis players
Olympic tennis players of France
Tennis players at the 1912 Summer Olympics
Olympic bronze medalists for France
Olympic medalists in tennis
Medalists at the 1912 Summer Olympics
Tennis players from Paris